The Face is an American reality television modeling competition series. The show is hosted by Nigel Barker, who was a previous judge on America's Next Top Model. The Face follows three supermodel coaches as they compete with each other to find 'the face' of a make-up brand. It premiered February 12, 2013, on Oxygen.

The series was renewed in April 2013 for a ten-episode second season, which premiered on March 5, 2014. While Naomi Campbell reappears in two seasons, Anne Vyalitsyna and Lydia Hearst replaced Coco Rocha and Karolina Kurkova as supermodel coaches for season two. In late 2014, Oxygen announced that they had no plans for a third season.

Hosts and mentors

Seasons

Mentor's color symbols
 Team Naomi (season 1–2)
 Team Coco (season 1)
 Team Karolina (season 1)
 Team Anne (season 2)
 Team Lydia (season 2)

See also
 The Face
 Make Me a Supermodel
 America's Next Top Model

References

External links

2010s American reality television series
2013 American television series debuts
2014 American television series endings
English-language television shows
Oxygen (TV channel) original programming
United States